Arbutus xalapensis, commonly known as the Texas madrone, Amazaquitl, or Texas madroño, is a species of flowering plant in the heather family. It is native to Central America, the southwestern United States (western Texas and New Mexico), and throughout Mexico. It is found in canyons and mountains, on rocky plains, and in oak woodlands, at altitudes of up to 3,000 m (10,000 feet) in the south of the range, but lower, down to 600 m (1800 feet) in the north of the range.

Arbutus xalapensis is a large shrub or small to medium-sized evergreen tree growing to 5–25 meters (17–84 feet) tall with a trunk up to 50 cm (20 inches) in diameter, with smooth orange-brown bark peeling in thin sheets. The size varies regionally with available rainfall, with small, shrubby plants in dry areas such as western Texas and New Mexico, and larger trees in moister areas of Mexico; plants in Texas, New Mexico, and the far northeast of Mexico are distinguished as a variety, A. xalapensis var. texana, or even a distinct species A. texana, by some botanists, but others do not regard these as distinct.

The leaves are oblong to lanceolate, 5–17 cm (2.0–6.8 inches) long and 1.5–5 cm (0.6–2.0 inches) broad, with an entire or serrated margin. The flowers are bell-shaped, white or pale pink, 5–10 mm long, produced in loose panicles. The fruit is a rough-surfaced red berry 1 cm (0.4 inches) in diameter, reportedly edible (however, those of related species have narcotic properties), and contains numerous small seeds.

References

External links
 Bosques Tropicales y Subtropicales: Arbutus xalapensis
 Bosques de Encino, Pino y Pino-Encino: Arbutus xalapensis
Plants for a Future: Arbutus xalapensis

xalapensis
Trees of Central America
Trees of Mexico
Trees of the South-Central United States
Flora of Northeastern Mexico
Trees of Puebla
Trees of Oaxaca
Plants described in 1819
Taxonomy articles created by Polbot
Flora of the Sierra Madre Occidental